Events from the year 1826 in Germany

Incumbents

Kingdoms 
 Kingdom of Prussia
 Monarch – Frederick William III of Prussia (16 November 1797 – 7 June 1840)
 Kingdom of Bavaria
 Monarch - Ludwig I (1825–1848)
 Kingdom of Saxony
 Frederick Augustus I (20 December 1806 – 5 May 1827)
 Kingdom of Hanover
 George IV  (29 January 1820 – 26 June 1830)
 Kingdom of Württemberg
 William (30 October 1816 – 25 June 1864)

Grand Duchies 
 Grand Duke of Baden
 Louis I (8 December 1818 – 30 March 1830) 
 Grand Duke of Hesse
 Louis I (14 August 1806 – 6 April 1830)
 Grand Duke of Mecklenburg-Schwerin
 Frederick Francis I– (24 April 1785 – 1 February 1837)
 Grand Duke of Mecklenburg-Strelitz
 George (6 November 1816 – 6 September 1860)
 Grand Duke of Oldenburg
 Peter I (2 July 1823 - 21 May 1829)
 Grand Duke of Saxe-Weimar-Eisenach
 Charles Frederick (14 June 1828 - 8 July 1853)

Principalities 
 Schaumburg-Lippe
 George William (13 February 1787 - 1860)
 Schwarzburg-Rudolstadt
 Friedrich Günther (28 April 1807 - 28 June 1867)
 Schwarzburg-Sondershausen
 Günther Friedrich Karl I (14 October 1794 - 19 August 1835)
 Principality of Lippe
 Leopold II (5 November 1802 - 1 January 1851)
 Principality of Reuss-Greiz
 Heinrich XIX (29 January 1817 - 31 October 1836)
 Waldeck and Pyrmont
 George II (9 September 1813 - 15 May 1845)

Duchies 
 Duke of Anhalt-Dessau
 Leopold IV (9 August 1817 - 22 May 1871)
 Duke of Brunswick
 Charles II (16 June 1815 – 9 September 1830)
 Duke of Saxe-Altenburg
 Duke of Saxe-Hildburghausen (1780–1826) and Duke of Saxe-Altenburg (1826–1834) - Frederick
 Duke of Saxe-Coburg and Gotha
 Ernest I (9 December 1806 – 12 November 1826)
 Duke of Saxe-Meiningen
 Bernhard II (24 December 1803–20 September 1866)

Events 
 July – Ludwig van Beethoven puts the finishing touches on the String Quartet in C sharp Minor, Opus 131, the jewel in the crown of his late string quartets.
 Ludwig van Beethoven composes the Große Fuge.

Births 
 February 16- Joseph Victor von Scheffel, German poet (d. 1888)
 March 29 – Wilhelm Liebknecht, German journalist, politician (d. 1900)

 August 21 – Karl Gegenbaur, German anatomist, professor (d. 1903) 
 September 17 – Bernhard Riemann, German mathematician (d. 1866)

Deaths 

 March 29 – Johann Heinrich Voss, German poet (b. 1751)
 April 25 – Karl Ludwig von Phull, German military leader (b. 1757)
 May 16 – Empress Elizabeth Alexeievna, consort of Alexander I of Russia (b. 1779)
 June 5 – Carl Maria von Weber, German composer (b. 1786)
 June 7 – Joseph von Fraunhofer, German optician (b. 1787)

 November 23 – Johann Elert Bode, German astronomer (b. 1747)

References

Years of the 19th century in Germany
Germany
Germany
1826 in Germany